Kintbury Newt Ponds is a   nature reserve in Kintbury in Berkshire. It is managed by the Berkshire, Buckinghamshire and Oxfordshire Wildlife Trust.

The reserve is made up of several ponds, reedbed, scrub and grassland.

History
Kintbury Newt Ponds was given its nature reserve status in the late 1990s when the site was discovered to have resident Great Crested Newts, which stopped a housing development being built on the site.

Fauna
The site has the following fauna:

Amphibians

Great Crested Newt
Smooth Newt
Palmate newt

References

Parks and open spaces in Berkshire
Berkshire, Buckinghamshire and Oxfordshire Wildlife Trust
Nature reserves in Berkshire
Local Nature Reserves in Berkshire
Kintbury